Brooks Field  is a city-owned, public-use airport located one nautical mile (1.85 km) south of the central business district of Marshall, a city in Calhoun County, Michigan, United States. Brooks Field was officially dedicated in 1931, although the first plane landed there on November 9, 1929.

Although many U.S. airports use the same three-letter location identifier for the FAA and IATA, this airport is assigned RMY by the FAA and no designation from the IATA. It is included in the Federal Aviation Administration (FAA) National Plan of Integrated Airport Systems for 2017–2021, in which it is categorized as a local general aviation facility.

Facilities and aircraft 
It has one runway designated 10/28 with an asphalt surface measuring 3,501 by 75 feet (1,067 x 23 m). It also has a one helipad designated H1 with a concrete surface measuring 50 by 50 feet (15 x 15 m). The airport is staffed from 8AM until dusk, except for major holidays.

The airport has a fixed-base operator that offers aircraft parking, lounges, and avgas.

For the 12-month period ending December 31, 2020, the airport had 8,400 operations, an average of 23 per day. This included almost 100% general aviation and <1% military. At that time there were 36 aircraft based on the field, including 31 single engine airplanes, 4 gliders, and 1 multi-engine airplane.

Transit
I-94 is also very close to the airport. The airport is accessible by road from Kalamazoo Street.

References

External links 
 Brooks Field at City of Marshall web site
 Marshall Aviation Center, the fixed-base operator (FBO)
   at Michigan DOT Airport Directory
 Aerial image as of 13 April 1999 from USGS The National Map
 

Airports in Michigan
Transportation buildings and structures in Calhoun County, Michigan